Greeks in North Macedonia form an ethnic minority numbering 294 individuals per 2021 census, with ranges higher in certain nationalist Greek estimates.

Current status 
Greeks are mainly settled now in the cities of Gevgelija (Gevgelī́) and Bitola (Monastī́ri). Today most Greeks in the country are political refugees who fled Greece due to the Greek Civil War and their descendants. Ethnologue also cites Greek as an "immigrant language" in the Republic of North Macedonia. 
The most recent census (2002) recorded 422 individuals declaring their ethnicity as Greek.

Alternative estimates 
The Greek right-wing party Popular Orthodox Rally claims via questions presented in the Greek Parliament that there are more than 100,000 (up to 280,000) Greeks that now live in the country. This number is not supported officially by the Greek Ministry of Foreign Affairs. According to a Greek research, the Greek population of North Macedonia in 1996 made up 2% of the total population, consisting of approximately 42,000 individuals.

Aromanian controversy 
The controversy surrounding a Greek minority within the Republic of North Macedonia stems from the statistical treatment of Aromanian population groups in the country, who in their majority used to identify themselves as Greeks as part of the Rum millet. A large number of Aromanians with Greek identity left the region after the Balkan Wars, with Florina in Greece witnessing the arrival of a large Greek-speaking commercial population from Monastiri (Bitola). The present-day community is a remnant of the formerly larger Aromanian community of the part of Macedonia that fell within the borders of the Kingdom of Serbia after the Balkan Wars. Today, the Aromanians in North Macedonia are an officially recognized minority group numbering ca. 10,000 people, although some estimates put this number higher.

Notable historical personalities
The following people were born during Ottoman times in what is today North Macedonia:
Theodoros Adam, chieftain of the Macedonian Struggle
Charalambos Boufidis, chieftain of the Macedonian Struggle
Petros Christou (1887-1908), chieftain of the Macedonian Struggle
Georgios Karaiskakis (-1910), chieftain of the Macedonian Struggle
Evangelos Koukoudeas, chieftain of the Macedonian Struggle
Dimitrios Lalas (1844/48-1911), composer and musician
Georgios Modis (1887-1975), jurist, politician, writer and participant in the Macedonian Struggle
Traianos Nallis (1874-?), politician
Pantelis Papaioannou (c.1880-1907), chieftain of the Macedonian Struggle
Theofylaktos Papakonstantinou (1905-1991), writer and politician
Anastasios Pichion (1836-1913), educator and participant the Macedonian Struggle
Michail Sapkas (1873-1956), politician and doctor
Dimitrios Semsis (1883-1950), violinist
Michael Sionidis (1870-1935), chieftain of the Macedonian Struggle
Alexandros Svolos (1892-1956), President of Political Committee of National Liberation during WW2
Dimitrios Tsapanos (1882 or 1883-), chieftain of the Macedonian Struggle
Dimitrios Tsitsimis, chieftain of the Macedonian Struggle
Georgios Vafopoulos (1903-1996), poet, writer, teacher and journalist
Antonios Zois (1869-1941), chieftain of the Macedonian Struggle

See also 
 Greece–North Macedonia relations

References

North Macedonia, Republic of
Ethnic groups in North Macedonia
Greece–North Macedonia relations